Heliothis sublimis is a species of moth of the family Noctuidae first described by Emilio Berio in 1962. It is found in Africa, including South Africa.

External links
 

Heliothis
Lepidoptera of Angola
Lepidoptera of the Democratic Republic of the Congo
Lepidoptera of South Africa
Lepidoptera of Zambia
Lepidoptera of Zimbabwe
Moths of Sub-Saharan Africa
Moths described in 1962
Taxa named by Emilio Berio